Mark Hall is an American Mixed Martial Artist and Amateur Kickboxer who competed in the Light heavyweight division.  Hall is most famous for his 42 second stoppage of the 390lb Sumo World Champion, Koji Kitao at UFC 9. Hall is also known for his bouts against Don Frye at UFC: Ultimate Ultimate 1996, THE U-JAPAN Super Fighting Vol.1, and UFC 10.

Championships and Accomplishments
International Vale Tudo Championship
IVC 2 Tournament Semifinalist
Ultimate Fighting Championship
UFC 7 Tournament Semifinalist
UFC Ultimate Ultimate 1996 Tournament Semifinalist
Founder of Cobra Fighting Federation
In 1998, Mark hosted the very first legal MMA event in California, at the Stampede in Temecula, CA
Hosted the very first MMA event held on Indian Reservation in the state of California.  One week before Terry launched King of the Cage

Mixed martial arts record

|-
| Loss
| align=center| 5–6
| John Cole
| TKO (punches)
| CFF: Cobra Classic 2001
| 
| align=center| 2
| align=center| 2:15
| Anza, California, United States
| 
|-
| Loss
| align=center| 5–5
| Artur Mariano
| TKO (punches)
| rowspan=2|IVC 2: A Question of Pride
| rowspan=2|
| align=center| 1
| align=center| 8:26
| rowspan=2|Brazil
| 
|-
| Win
| align=center| 5–4
| Luiz Fraga
| TKO (submission to punches)
| align=center| 1
| align=center| 9:19
| 
|-
| Loss
| align=center| 4–4
| Don Frye
| Submission (achilles lock)
| UFC: Ultimate Ultimate 1996
| 
| align=center| 1
| align=center| 0:20
| Birmingham, Alabama, United States
| 
|-
| Win
| align=center| 4–3
| Felix Mitchell
| TKO (punches)
| UFC: Ultimate Ultimate 1996
| 
| align=center| 1
| align=center| 1:45
| Birmingham, Alabama, United States
| 
|-
| Loss
| align=center| 3–3
| Don Frye
| Submission (forearm choke)
| U-Japan
| 
| align=center| 1
| align=center| 5:29
| Japan
| 
|-
| Loss
| align=center| 3–2
| Don Frye
| TKO (punches)
| UFC 10: The Tournament
| 
| align=center| 1
| align=center| 10:21
| Birmingham, Alabama, United States
| 
|-
| Win
| align=center| 3–1
| Koji Kitao
| TKO (doctor stoppage)
| UFC 9: Motor City Madness
| 
| align=center| 1
| align=center| 0:40
| Detroit, Michigan, United States
| 
|-
| Win
| align=center| 2–1
| Trent Jenkins
| Submission (armlock)
| UFC: Ultimate Ultimate 1995
| 
| align=center| 1
| align=center| 5:29
| Denver, Colorado, United States
| 
|-
| Loss
| align=center| 1–1
| Paul Varelans
| Submission (americana)
| rowspan=2|UFC 7: The Brawl in Buffalo
| rowspan=2|
| align=center| 1
| align=center| 1:04
| rowspan=2|Buffalo, New York, United States
| 
|-
| Win
| align=center| 1–0
| Harold Howard
| TKO (submission to punches)
| align=center| 1
| align=center| 1:41
|

See also
List of male mixed martial artists

References

External links
 
 

 Mark Hall at mixedmartialarts.com
 http://www.markcobrahall.com

American male mixed martial artists
Light heavyweight mixed martial artists
Mixed martial artists utilizing taekwondo
Mixed martial artists utilizing karate
Mixed martial artists utilizing shootfighting
Mixed martial artists utilizing Brazilian jiu-jitsu
Living people
1974 births
Ultimate Fighting Championship male fighters
American male taekwondo practitioners
American male karateka
American practitioners of Brazilian jiu-jitsu